Abrodiaeta may refer to:
 Abrodiaeta (katydid), a genus of katydids in the family Tettigoniidae
 Abrodiaeta, a genus of insects in the family Ectobiidae, synonym of Allacta
 Abrodiaeta, a genus of beetles in the family Carabidae, synonym of Abrodiella